Gaston de Trannoy (17 October 1880 – 24 December 1960) was a Belgian equestrian. He competed at the 1912 Summer Olympics and 1920 Summer Olympics.

References

External links
 

1880 births
1960 deaths
Belgian male equestrians
Olympic equestrians of Belgium
Equestrians at the 1912 Summer Olympics
Equestrians at the 1920 Summer Olympics
Sportspeople from Mons